Bangladesh Chemical Industries Corporation (BCIC) is a government owned corporation in Bangladesh. Shah Md. Imdadul Haque is the chairman of Bangladesh Chemical Industries Corporation.

History 
Bangladesh Chemical Industries Corporation was founded in 1976. It is in charge of Karnafuli Paper Mills, the largest Paper Mill in Bangladesh. Haiul Quaium is the present chairman of the corporation. It operates 12 factories in Bangladesh including Ashuganj Fertilizer and Chemical Company Limited in Brahmanbaria, Urea Fertiliser Factory Ltd in Ghorashal and Polash Urea Fertiliser Factory in Palash, Narsingdi. The corporation has liabilities of 51.06 billion taka to state owned banks. BCIC College is run by the corporation. In 1982 it set up the first tiles factory in Bangladesh. It is subsidized by Bangladesh government. The Training Institute for Chemical Industries (TICI) is a sister concern of BCIC and is run by BCIC too. Chittagong Urea Fertilizer School and College falls under this corporation, as does Urea Sar Karkhana School & College.

Corruption 
Deputy-chief of personnel Momtaz Begum of BCIC was found involved in graft and nepotism after a probe by the Ministry of Industries. She was promoted despite the findings of the probe to chief of personnel. In March 2017 Mohammad Iqbal, the chairman of the BCIC, was transferred to Bangladesh Climate Change Trust, and was replaced by Additional Secretary Shah Md Aminul Haq. Iqbal refused to hand over his charge to Haq and has since been lobbying government officials to retain his job as of April 2017. On 17 May 2017, Harun-ar-Rashid, the chief of BCIC warehouse in Patuakhali disappeared along with 100 million taka worth fertilizer. BCIC had seen in the past, hundreds of thousands of fertilizer disappearing.

See also
Triple Super Phosphate Complex Limited
Jamuna Fertilizer Company Limited
Ashuganj Fertilizer and Chemical Company Limited
Bangladesh Insulator and Sanitaryware Factory Limited
Usmania Glass Sheet Factory Limited
Khulna Hard Board Mills Limited
Khulna Newsprint Mills Limited
Miracle Industries Limited

References

Manufacturing companies based in Dhaka
Government-owned companies of Bangladesh
Organisations based in Motijheel
Chemical companies established in 1976
Corruption in Bangladesh
Chemical companies of Bangladesh
Bangladeshi companies established in 1976